Les Enfants du naufrageur is a French adventure film from 1992. It was directed by Jérôme Foulon written by François Celier, starring Jean Marais and Brigitte Fossey. The film is also known as "Shipwrecked Children".

Cast 
 Brigitte Fossey: Helene
 Jacques Dufilho: Petit Louis
 Michel Robin: Paul
 Jean Marais: Marc-Antoine
 Pierre-Alexis Hollenbeck: Capitan
 Benjamin Brault: Pinocchio
 Maxime Boidron: Benoît
 Simon Poligne: Lamazou
 François Vigner: Pérec
 Elie Berder: Merliot
 Gary Ledoux: Bisson
 : Marion
 : The mayor
 Michel Dussarat: Toinou
 Jenny Clève: Martha
 :a fisherman

References

External links 
 
 
 Les Enfants du naufrageur (1992) at Films de France

1992 television films
1992 films
French adventure films
1990s French-language films
1990s adventure films
1990s French films